Heritage Station is a CTrain light rail station in Haysboro, Calgary, Alberta as part of the original South Line (Route 201) which opened on May 25, 1981.

The station, with a large 557 space park-and-ride lot, is located on the exclusive LRT right of way (adjacent to CPR right-of-way), 7.9 km south of the City Hall Interlocking, west of Macleod Trail.

The station consists of a center-loading platform with mezzanine access on the north end and an at-grade access at the south end.

As part of Calgary Transit's plans to operate four-car trains by the end of 2014, all three-car stations were extended. Construction at Heritage Station to extend the platform to the South started on July 16, 2012, and the new extended platform and ramp access opened on December 10, 2012.

South of the station, in "Haysboro Storage Facility" trains are stored.

In 2005, the station registered an average transit of 13,600 boardings per weekday.

Crime 
Heritage Station has been criticized for being a crime hotspot in the Calgary C-Train System. On a CityNews interview in January 2022 with Calgary Transit Lead Staff 'Stephen Tauro', it was listed as one of the 5 stations with an unusually high crime rate. The others being: Marlborough, Rundle, Southland and Sunalta Stations.

References

CTrain stations
Railway stations in Canada opened in 1981
1981 establishments in Alberta